Mir Shihab-ud-Din Siddiqui, known by his title Ghaziuddin Khan, was a leading military general and noble of the Mughal empire during the reign of emperor Aurangzeb. He was an important player in Mughal court politics, and played key roles in several military campaigns. A favoured noble of Aurangzeb, he was the father of Chin Qilich Khan, founder of Hyderabad State.

Early life 
Ghaziuddin Khan was born in Bukhara (in present-day Uzbekistan) as Mir Shihab ud-Din Siddiqui, in the year 1649. He was the eldest son of Abid Khan, who had emigrated to Mughal India earlier than him and later became a favoured noble of emperor Aurangzeb. Ghaziuddin Khan's grandfather was a prominent intellectual of Bukhara named Alam Shaikh, who traced his descent to renowned saint Shihabuddin Suhrawardi.

Career

Reign of Aurangzeb 
Mir Shihab-ud-Din arrived in Mughal India around 1670, during the reign of Mughal emperor Aurangzeb. Accepted into the court, he was soon deployed as a commander in several military campaigns of the Deccan. He received the title Ghaziuddin Khan Bahadur' in 1684 due to his successes fighting against the Marathas. He additionally received the title 'Firuz Jang' (victorious in battle) in 1685. He also distinguished himself in 1681 by performing a dangerous mission during the rebellion of Aurangzeb's fourth son, prince Muhammad Akbar.

In 1685, he participated in the Siege of Bijapur, and was credited with the campaign's success. He was particularly recognised for leading a difficult expedition during this campaign, to relieve a trapped and starving army led by prince Azam, Aurangzeb's third son. For his action he was rewarded with the fish standard (mahi maratib), and received the title 'farzand-i arjomand (distinguished son). A year later, he captured the city of Adoni.

In 1687, he fought in the Siege of Golconda and capture of Hyderabad, in which campaign his father Abid Khan died. During this campaign, he alerted the emperor Aurangzeb of collusion between his second son, prince Muazzam, and the enemy (the Golconda Sultanate). He also played a significant part in the arrest of the Sultanate's nominal heir and sons. According to historian Satish Chandra, Ghaziuddin Khan lost his eyesight in 1686 due to bubonic plague in Hyderabad; however, Ebba Koch asserts that he lost his eyesight in 1690, and attributes this to a plague during the Siege of Bijapur. After he was blinded, he was allowed to continue his career in the Mughal military and administration.

Beginning in the late 1680s, the nobles of Aurangzeb's court were split into two rival factions: Ghaziuddin Khan and his son Chin Qilich Khan (later Nizam of Hyderabad) were leaders of one group, while the other group was headed by Asad Khan (wazir or chief minister of the empire) and his son Zulfiqar Khan. Key members of the first faction were Ghaziuddin Khan, his son Chin Qilich Khan, his cousin Muhammad Amin Khan, and two other sons of his, Hamid Khan Bahadur and Rahimuddin Khan.

In 1698, Ghaziuddin Khan was appointed governor of Berar Subah, a province of the empire. He held this governorship for the rest of Aurangzeb's reign. In 1704, Feroze Jung routed a Maratha army that was besieging Sironj.

In the early 1700s, Ghaziuddin Khan and other members of the family began to stockpile arms, in anticipation of emperor Aurangzeb's death. This was to deter possible aggression from his sons, the princes. Ghaziuddin, Chin Qilich, and Muhammad Amin also decided to stay neutral in any potential war of succession among the princes. Historian Munis Faruqui describes their policy as one of 'armed neutrality', and notes that previously in Mughal history, nobles had never been allowed to stay neutral in succession conflicts. Following the emperor's death in 1707, Ghaziuddin and his family stayed successfully neutral during the ensuing war of succession. Ghaziuddin Khan was repeatedly asked to join prince Azam Shah's army, but he refused.

Reign of Bahadur Shah 
Aurangzeb's second son, prince Muazzam, emerged victorious in the war of succession and was crowned as emperor Bahadur Shah. Ghaziuddin Khan and his family were pardoned and rewarded by the emperor despite their lack of support in the war, possibly due to their military value. Ghaziuddin Khan was made governor of Gujarat Subah by the new emperor.

Death 
Ghaziuddin Khan died in Ahmadabad, capital of Gujarat Subah, in the year 1710. His body was brought to Delhi, where it was buried in a madrasa complex he had founded during his lifetime, located near Delhi's Ajmeri Gate.

Family 
Emperor Aurangzeb took an active interest in cultivating Ghaziuddin Khan and his family, perhaps in an effort to gain an ultra-loyal group of nobles. Upon Ghaziuddin's arrival in India, Aurangzeb arranged him a prestigious marriage to Safiya Khanum, daughter of renowned Mughal wazir Saadullah Khan. This honor was in addition to several promotions his father Abid Khan had received prior. The marriage took place in 1670; their first son was Chin Qilich Khan (born Mir Qamaruddin), who Aurangzeb personally named and mentored. He went on to become a major noble of the court, later becoming the first Nizam and founder of Hyderabad State. Ghaziuddin Khan was first cousins with noble Muhammad Amin Khan, who was promoted to the high-ranking position of sadr-us-sudr during Aurangzeb's reign, and later became wazir (prime minister) of the empire. Ghaziuddin Khan also had two other sons: Hamid Khan Bahadur and Rahimuddin Khan.

Philanthropy
In 1690s, through religious endowment he founded a madarsa, Madrasa Ghaziuddin Khan after him.

Ghaziuddin complex 

The Ghaziuddin Khan complex or the Madrasa Ghaziuddin in Old Delhi located adjacent to New Delhi railway station on the Ajmeri Gate side consists of the mosque and tomb of Ghazi ud-Din Khan Feroze Jung I and the Anglo Arabic Senior Secondary School. Previously a madrasa functioned here. Over the decades different educational institutions have functioned from here.

Madrasa Ghaziuddin Khan became the historic and influential Delhi College which eventually paved way for the present Zakir Hussain College (University of Delhi), which in 1986, shifted to a new building outside Turkman Gate, the old structure in the Madrasa Ghaziuddin complex, still houses a hostel for the college and also has his Ghaziuddin's mausoleum.

References

Bibliography 

 
 
 

Mughal generals
1640s births
1710 deaths
18th-century Indian Muslims
Subahdars of Gujarat
Subahdars of Berar
People from Bukhara
Mughal nobility